"Awake" is the lead single and title track from Godsmack's second studio album. "Awake" is best known for its use in the 2000's US Navy advertisements "Accelerate Your Life", with voiceover by Keith David.

Background
In an MTV online chat, Godsmack vocalist Sully Erna said that "Awake" is Godsmack "getting some closure, on a past relationship". Erna then said: "That's me getting closure on a relationship. I'm just saying that now I'm awake, and I'm able to deal with everything I have to deal with. Where before I felt like I was going to lose control without this person in my life. I'm saying that I'm okay now without that person".

Release and commercial performance
"Awake" was released to radio on June 3, 2000. "Awake" achieved mainstream success. The song was on the Mainstream Rock chart for 53 weeks and peaked at number one. "Awake" also was on the Alternative Songs chart for 28 weeks and peaked at number 12. "Awake" was on the Bubbling Under Hot 100 Singles chart for 24 weeks and peaked at number one on the chart in 2001. "Awake" was nominated for the Rock Single of the Year category at the 2001 Billboard Music Awards. With the popularity of "Awake", Godsmack's album of the same name was certified 2× Platinum by the RIAA in March 2002.

Music video
The music video made for this single was filmed at the Ohio State Reformatory in Mansfield, Ohio. The video contains footage of prisoners rioting and leaving the reformatory, and seeing Godsmack play in the exercise yard inside a fenced-in area. The music video was produced by the band.

Versions
There are three versions of "Awake", the first version, which is the original version, appeared on Godsmack second studio album, Awake. The second version is a radio edit which appeared on the single release of the song, and the third is an acoustic version called "Asleep", which appeared on their EP, The Other Side.

The radio edit is the same song as the album version, just shortened. The album and acoustic versions have very similar lyrics but different sound. The acoustic version runs for 3:58, making it closer to the radio edit than the full album version.

Appearances
This song was featured prominently in the Nash Bridges episode "Manhunt" that first aired on November 3, 2000. It was also featured in the game Dave Mirra Freestyle BMX 2 and The One starring Jet Li.

Since the mid-2000s, the song has been featured extensively in the U.S. Navy's "Accelerate Your Life" commercials. The Godsmack album Awake'''s opening track, "Sick of Life," would also be used in the campaign.

The song also made an appearance on several compilations including the band greatest hits album, Good Times, Bad Times... Ten Years of Godsmack, WWF Tough Enough, Kerrang: Life Is Loud, and Crusty Demons: Unleash Hell.

The song features as the background track in the promos of the 2006 Bollywood film Fight Club''.

U.S. Navy support
Although the song was featured in the United States Navy's "Accelerate Your Life" commercials, Erna insists that Godsmack doesn't support any war: "By no means has this band ever supported any war for any country or that we support government decisions or why we're sticking our nose in other people's business at times. What we support is our troops. And the women and men that go over there — or anywhere — to fight for our country and our lives and protect our freedom and I feel that."

"I actually sympathize with a lot of the soldiers, and the military in general, that are trained to go out and protect for us, and what they have to go through, it's really kind of shitty in a sense that these young kids have to go over there and die, sometimes, for something that isn't our problem. And that kind of sucks. So what I have to do is at least support them, because they don't have the choice that we do."

Some critics say that the band's young audience would be influenced to join the military because of the popular tunes. However, Erna expressed doubt that someone would join the Marines or the Navy because they heard Godsmack as the underlying music in the commercial.

Track listing

Chart positions

References

Bibliography

External links

2000 singles
2000 songs
Godsmack songs
Songs written by Sully Erna
Universal Records singles